Culpho (pronounced Cul-fo) is a hamlet and civil parish in the East Suffolk district of Suffolk, about  northeast of the centre of Ipswich and  west of Woodbridge.

Culpho's population is less than 100, so the Office for National Statistics includes it in the total for the civil parish of Grundisburgh for the 2011 census. Other neighbouring villages include Great Bealings, Westerfield, and Playford.

Toponym
The earliest known record of the toponym is Culfole in the Domesday Book of 1086, which list the population as 22 households. In 12th-century records it appears as Colfho in 1168, Culfou in 1169 and Culfo in 1175. A pipe roll of 1178 records it as Culfho and an entry in the Book of Fees for 1250 records it as Colvesho. It is derived from Old English, probably meaning "Cūþwulf's hōh" (hōh = "spur of land").

Parish church
The earliest parts of the Church of England parish church of St Botolph include the chancel, which is 13th-century. The nave has 14th-century features including a doorway and windows. There is also a 14th-century piscina in the chancel. The baptismal font is 15th-century. The church has a southwest tower with the porch built into its ground stage. The nave roof was rebuilt with new timbers in the 17th century.

The church was restored in 1884. It is a grade II* listed building.

St Botolph's church was granted to the Premonstratensian Leiston Abbey in the 13th century. The parish is now part of a shared benefice with Great Bealings, Little Bealings and Playford.

Thankful village
Culpho is one of the Thankful Villages, the few dozen parishes in England and Wales that suffered no fatalities in the First World War.

References

Bibliography

External links

Civil parishes in Suffolk
Villages in Suffolk